Lionel Lifschitz (25 May 1898 – 1 July 1977) was a French fencer. He competed in the team sabre competition at the 1924 Summer Olympics.

References

External links
 

1898 births
1977 deaths
French male sabre fencers
Olympic fencers of France
Fencers at the 1924 Summer Olympics
Fencers from Paris